"For Me and My Gal" is a 1917 popular standard song by George W. Meyer with lyrics by Edgar Leslie and E. Ray Goetz. Popular recordings of the song in 1917 were by Van and Schenck; Prince's Orchestra; Henry Burr and Albert Campbell; and by Billy Murray.

This song was used in the 1942 film of the same name, where it is the first song that Jo Hayden (Judy Garland) and Harry Palmer (Gene Kelly) perform together. The Decca single release of the Garland/Kelly version was a major hit in 1942.

Other versions
Guy Lombardo and his Orchestra (vocal by Kenny Gardner). This charted briefly in 1943.
Al Jolson recorded it on June 11, 1947 for Decca Records. The song was used in the film Jolson Sings Again when it was performed by Larry Parks (dubbed by Al Jolson). 
Perry Como - included in his album So Smooth (1955) 
Freddy Cannon - a single release in 1961 (Swan 4083). (Freddy Cannon#Singles).
Burl Ives - included in the album My Gal Sal and Other Favorites (1965).

Accolades
The Garland/Kelly recording of "For Me and My Gal" was inducted into the Grammy Hall of Fame in 2010.(List of Grammy Hall of Fame Award recipients (E–I)).

References

1917 songs
1943 singles
Songs written by Edgar Leslie
Judy Garland songs
Songs written by George W. Meyer
Grammy Hall of Fame Award recipients
Songs written by E. Ray Goetz
Van and Schenck songs
Songs about marriage